Longo is a village in the Punjab province of Pakistan. It is located at 32°45'0N 73°45'0E with an altitude of 244 metres (803 feet).

References

Villages in Punjab, Pakistan